Stephen Patrick Connolly (born 29 November 1989 in Glasgow) is a Scottish football midfielder who is currently without a club. He was forced into retiring from the game due to a serious knee injury. He is a product of Hamilton's youth system, prior to joining Hamilton he played in the Dundee United youth system.

Career

He signed a YTS contract with Clyde in July 2007, and made his senior debut on the 18 August 2007, coming on as a half-time  substitute against Partick Thistle in a 4–0 defeat in the Scottish Football League First Division. He would go on to make 5 more appearances for the first team that season. He signed his first professional contract in May 2008.

In December 2008, he joined Stenhousemuir on loan for a month. He made four appearances in total for the Warriors and returned to Clyde with the short-term loan deemed a success. He then joined Stranraer on loan until the end of the season in January 2009, along with Jordan Murch. However, the loan was terminated early and he returned to Clyde after only three appearances.

Connolly was released by Clyde in June 2009 along with the rest of the out of contract players, due to the club's financial position.

He had a short spell at Linlithgow Rose in 2012 before retiring.

Personal life
His younger brother Sean plays for Clyde.

See also
Clyde F.C. season 2007-08 | 2008-09

References

External links

1989 births
Living people
Scottish footballers
Clyde F.C. players
Stenhousemuir F.C. players
Stranraer F.C. players
Linlithgow Rose F.C. players
Scottish Football League players
Association football wingers